Randy Soderman is a retired American soccer player and technology entrepreneur.

The younger brother of Rick Soderman, Randy played for CISCO Soccer Club in Phoenix growing up.  In 1992, he graduated from Cactus High School.  That year, he joined the Arizona Cotton for the 1992–93 USISL indoor season.  Soderman attended Glendale Community College where he was a 1993 NJCAA Second Team All American.  In the summer of 1994, Soderman played outdoors with the Arizona Cotton.  That fall, he entered Grand Canyon University, playing one season on the men’s soccer team before declaring himself eligible for the CISL professional draft.  In 1995, he turned professional with the Arizona Sandsharks of the Continental Indoor Soccer League that was led by Ron Newman.  That fall, he signed with the Chicago Power of the National Professional Soccer League.  In the summer of 1996, he forgoed playing in the MLS to continue indoor play with the Sacramento Knights of the CISL.  In 1998 and 1999, Soderman played for the Arizona Sahuaros of the USL D-3 Pro League, then returned to indoor summer soccer in 1999 with the Arizona Thunder of the World Indoor Soccer League where he won the WISL Defender of the Year award.  

In 2000 and 2001, he was with the Tucson Fireballs in the USL D-3 Pro League.  In 2004, Soderman returned indoors with the St. Louis Steamers of the Major Indoor Soccer League.  He played two season with the Steamers where he was voted to the MISL All-Star team in both years.  In 2006, the Milwaukee Wave selected Soderman as their first overall pick in the Dispersal Draft. That same year, Soderman was called up to the United States National Futsal Team.   On October 17, 2006, the Milwaukee Wave sent Soderman and Alen Osmanovic to the Chicago Storm in exchange for Anthony Maher and Tijani Ayegbusi.  The two seasons he spent with the Storm were the last two professional seasons Soderman played. Soderman retired from professional soccer in 2008 after the birth of his first daughter, Blakeley Soderman.  

Since retiring for professional soccer in 2008, Soderman continue to play recreationally for many semi-pro teams. He returned to the Arizona Sahuaros, now playing in the National Premier Soccer League.  In 2009, the Sahuaros played in the United States Adult Soccer Association.  On August 13, 2012, the Tucson Extreme of the Professional Arena Soccer League signed Soderman as head coach.  In September, the team announced it would delay its first season and Soderman signed with Real Phoenix FC in the Professional Arena Soccer League.

Also, following retirement in 2008, Soderman entered into the technology industry where he founded Soderman Marketing & Xtraman Fundraising. In 2016, Soderman launched Elite Web Design of Phoenix as an extension of Soderman Marketing. In 2016 Soderman co-founded and launched an auto glass software company called Glass Shop Go. In early 2018 Soderman was invited to join the Forbes Council.

References

Living people
1974 births
American soccer players
Arizona Sandsharks players
Arizona Sahuaros players
Arizona Thunder players
Chicago Storm players
Continental Indoor Soccer League players
Major Indoor Soccer League (2001–2008) players
National Professional Soccer League (1984–2001) players
Sacramento Knights players
St. Louis Steamers (1998–2006) players
Tucson Fireballs players
USISL players
USL Second Division players
Association football midfielders
American men's futsal players
Soccer players from Arizona
Sportspeople from Glendale, Arizona
Professional Arena Soccer League players
National Premier Soccer League players
Association football defenders